An Ames room is a distorted room that creates an optical illusion. Likely influenced by the writings of Hermann Helmholtz, it was invented by American scientist Adelbert Ames Jr. in 1946, and constructed in the following year.

Usage and effect 

An Ames room is viewed with one eye through a peephole. Through the peephole, the room appears to be an ordinary rectangular cuboid, with a back wall that is vertical and at right angles to the observer's line of sight, two vertical side walls parallel to each other, and a horizontal floor and ceiling. 

The observer will see that an adult standing in one corner of the room along the back wall appears to be a giant, while another adult standing in the other corner along the back wall appears to be a dwarf. And if an adult moves from one corner of the room to the other, they will appear to dramatically change in size.

Explanation 

The true shape of the room is that of an irregular hexahedron: depending on the design of the room, all surfaces can be regular or irregular quadrilaterals, so that one corner of the room is farther from an observer than the other.

The illusion of an ordinary room is because most information about the true shape of the room does not reach the observer's eye.
The geometry of the room is carefully designed, using perspective, so that, from the peephole, the image projected onto the retina of the observer's eye is the same as that of an ordinary room. Once the observer is prevented from perceiving the real locations of the parts of the room, the illusion that it is an ordinary room occurs.

One key aspect of preventing the observer from perceiving the true shape of the room is the peephole. It has at least three consequences:
 It forces the observer to be at the location where the image projected into their eye is of an ordinary room. From any other location, the observer would see the room's true shape.
 It forces the observer to use one eye to look into the room, preventing them from getting any information about the real shape of the room from stereopsis, which requires two eyes.
 It prevents the observer from moving their eye to a different location, preventing them from getting any information about the real shape of the room from motion parallax.

Other sources of information about the true shape of the room are also removed by its designer. For example, by strategic lighting, the true far corner is as bright as the true near corner. For another example, patterns on the walls (such as windows) and floor (such as a black-and-white chequerboard of tiles) can be made consistent with its illusory geometry.

The illusion is powerful enough to overcome other information about the true locations of objects in the room, such as familiar size. For example, although the observer knows that adults are all about the same size, an adult standing in the true near corner appears to be a giant, while another adult standing in the true far appears to be a dwarf. For another example, although the observer knows that an adult cannot change size, they see an adult who walks back and forth between the true far and true near corners appear to grow and shrink.

Studies have shown that the illusion can be created without using walls and a ceiling; it is sufficient to create an apparent horizon (which in reality will not be horizontal) against an appropriate background, and the eye relies on the apparent relative height of an object above that horizon.

Related phenomena

Trompe-l'œil
The Ames room has as a predecessor, from as early as the 15th century, the movement in art called trompe-l'œil, in which the artist creates the illusion of three-dimensional space, usually on a flat surface.

"Anti-gravity" illusion and gravity hills 
Ames's original design also contained a groove that was positioned such that a ball in it appears to roll uphill, against gravity. Richard Gregory regarded this apparent "anti-gravity" effect as more amazing than the apparent size changes, although today it is often not shown when an Ames room is exhibited.

Gregory speculated that "magnetic hills" (also known as gravity hills) can be explained by this principle. For such a location in Ayrshire, Scotland, known as the Electric Brae, he found that a row of trees form a background similar to the setting of an Ames room, making the water in a creek appear to flow uphill.

For Gregory, this observation raised particularly interesting questions about how different principles for understanding the world compete in our perception. The "anti-gravity effect" is a much stronger paradox than the "size change" effect, because it seems to negate the law of gravity which is a fundamental feature of the world. In contrast, the apparent size change is not such a strong paradox, because we do have the experience that objects can change size to a certain degree (for example, people and animals can appear to become smaller or larger by crouching or stretching).

Honi phenomenon 
A type of selective perceptual distortion known as the Honi phenomenon causes some married persons to perceive less size distortion of the spouse than a stranger in an Ames room.

The effect was related to the strength of love, liking, and trust of the spouse being viewed. Women who were high positive in this area perceived strangers as being more distorted than their partners. Size judgments by men did not seem to be influenced by the strength of their feeling toward their spouse.

Further study has concluded that the Honi phenomenon does not reliably exist as first thought, but may be explained as sex difference influencing perception, with women interpreting a larger reading as a more meaningful or valuable perception of things than men's.

In media 
The Ames room principle has been used widely in television and movie productions for special effects when it was necessary to show actors in giant size next to actors in small size. For example, production of The Lord of the Rings film trilogy used several Ames room sets in Shire sequences to make the heights of the diminutively-sized hobbits correct when standing next to the taller Gandalf.

When used for special effects, the viewers will not see that an Ames room is being used. However, a few times an Ames room has also been shown explicitly.

 An Ames room is used in the 1965 TV Special My Name Is Barbra. It enabled the star to shrink before singing a little girl medley, and return to normal size to sing adult songs.
 An Ames room is depicted in the 1971 film adaptation of the Roald Dahl novel Charlie and the Chocolate Factory.
 The 1960s television series Voyage to the Bottom of the Sea used an Ames room in the episode "The Enemies" to show, rather than just declare, an attempt to make two characters (one standing on each side of the room) lose their minds.
 Episode 141 of the first incarnation of the science educational television series 3-2-1 Contact has a segment in which the optical illusion of the Ames Room is demonstrated and explained 
 In the game Super Mario 64, the room containing the two paintings that lead to the level Tiny-Huge Island are placed at the end of two opposite hallways similar to an Ames room. When the player is standing at the perceived center of the room, the two hallways appear to have both the same depth and equally sized paintings. As the player approaches them, however, it is revealed that one painting is massive in scale and the other is miniature, respectively.
 The 2010 HBO film Temple Grandin used an Ames room in the opening title sequence, and later figures in the actual story, where the title character, who is autistic, intuitively devises the illusion in a scale model as a science project.
 English rock group Squeeze used an Ames room in their 1987 music video "Hourglass".
 English rock band Status Quo used an Ames room on the front cover of their 1975 studio album On the Level.
 English rock singer Roger Daltrey used an Ames room in the music video for his 1980 song "Free Me".
 An Ames room was used in the 2004 film Eternal Sunshine of the Spotless Mind to make the character Joel Barish appear to be the size of a young child.
 Dr. Eric M. Rogers used an Ames room to highlight how we attach familiar knowledge to the unfamiliar in his 1979 Royal Institution Christmas Lecture.
 German punk band Die Ärzte used an Ames room in their music video for the song "Fiasko".

See also 
 Forced perspective
 Ames trapezoid

References

External links 

 "How to build an Ames Room", Ri Channel video
 "Adelbert Ames, Fritz Heider and the Ames Chair Demonstration"
 
 
 
 
 
 

Optical illusions
Articles containing video clips